Teatro Lirico may refer to:

 Teatro Lirico (Milan) (formerly Teatro alla Canobbiana) in Milan, Italy
 Teatro Lirico di Cagliari in Cagliari, Sardinia, Italy
 Teatro Lirico Sperimentale in Spoleto, Italy
 Teatro Lirico Giuseppe Verdi in Trieste, Italy